is a Japanese football player who plays for Ventforet Kofu.

Career
On 22 December 2016, Uchida signed for Nagoya Grampus after a two years-period at Ehime FC.

Career statistics

Club

References

External links
Profile at Nagoya Grampus

1989 births
Living people
Association football people from Mie Prefecture
Japanese footballers
J1 League players
J2 League players
Sanfrecce Hiroshima players
Ehime FC players
Shimizu S-Pulse players
Kataller Toyama players
Nagoya Grampus players
Montedio Yamagata players
Ventforet Kofu players
Association football defenders